Arturo Ramos (born 13 October 1960) is a Cuban water polo player. He competed in the men's tournament at the 1980 Summer Olympics.

References

1960 births
Living people
Cuban male water polo players
Olympic water polo players of Cuba
Water polo players at the 1980 Summer Olympics
Place of birth missing (living people)